Rashard Malick Higgins (born October 7, 1994), nicknamed "Hollywood", is an American football wide receiver for the Carolina Panthers of the National Football League (NFL). He played college football at Colorado State.

Early years
Higgins attended Mesquite High School in Mesquite, Texas, where he was a three-sport athlete in football, basketball and track. He played as a wide receiver for the Mesquite football team. As a senior, he had 69 receptions for 1,136 yards 10 touchdowns. Higgins was a two-star recruit by Rivals.com. He was a starter on the Mesquite basketball team, where he averaged 17 points per game.

He also excelled in track & field at Mesquite. At the 2013 District Meet, he took fourth in the 200-meter dash with a time of 22.76 seconds, while also placing seventh in the long jump with a leap of 6.68 meters (21 ft, 8 in). He posted a personal-best time of 53.48 seconds in the 400-meter dash at the 2012 Rockin R Relays, where he finished fifth.

College career
As a true freshman at Colorado State University in 2013, Higgins started all 14 games. He finished the season with a school freshman record 68 receptions, which went for 837 yards and six touchdowns. As a sophomore in 2014, Higgins was a finalist for the Biletnikoff Award.

 2015 MW Preseason Offensive Player of the Year
 Finalist, 2014 Biletnikoff Award
 2014 consensus All-American
 Led nation in receiving yards (1,750) and receiving touchdowns (17) in 2014
 Ranked first in nation in yards-per-catch (18.2) among players with 65+ receptions
 Has 12 career games with 100 or more yards
 In just two seasons, has caught 164 passes for 2,587 yards and 23 touchdowns
 Named 2014 Male College Athlete of the Year by Colorado State Hall of Fame

Professional career

Cleveland Browns

The Cleveland Browns drafted Higgins in the fifth round with the 172nd overall pick in the 2016 NFL Draft. On May 13, he signed a four-year contract worth about $2.52 million, which included a signing bonus worth about $184,000. He had six receptions for 77 yards in his rookie season.

On September 3, 2017, Higgins was waived by the Browns and was signed to the practice squad the next day. He was promoted to the active roster on September 16, 2017. On September 17, in the Week 2 game against the Baltimore Ravens, he had a career-best seven receptions for 95 yards in the 24–10 loss. In the final game of the 2017 season, Higgins caught his first two career touchdown passes – both from DeShone Kizer. Overall, in the 2017 season, he finished with 27 receptions for 312 receiving yards and two touchdowns.
In 2018, Higgins further improved himself snatching 39 receptions for 572 yards and four touchdowns.

On March 4, 2019, the Browns tendered Higgins, who was set to become a restricted free agent. He caught his first touchdown of the season against the Buffalo Bills in Week 10, a seven-yard pass from Baker Mayfield that would prove to be the game-winner.

The Browns re-signed Higgins on May 8, 2020. In Week 7 of the 2020 season, he had his first 100-yard game with six receptions for 110 receiving yards in a 37-34 victory over the Cincinnati Bengals. He was placed on the reserve/COVID-19 list by the Browns on December 26, 2020, and activated on December 31.

Higgins became an unrestricted free agent following the 2020 season. On March 19, 2021, Higgins re-signed with the Browns on a one-year deal.

Carolina Panthers
On March 16, 2022, Higgins signed a one-year contract with the Carolina Panthers.

NFL career statistics

See also
 List of NCAA major college football yearly receiving leaders

References

External links
Cleveland Browns bio
Colorado State Rams bio

1994 births
Living people
African-American players of American football
All-American college football players
American football wide receivers
Cleveland Browns players
Colorado State Rams football players
Mesquite High School (Texas) alumni
Players of American football from Dallas
21st-century African-American sportspeople
Carolina Panthers players